The 2016 Trofeo Città di Brescia is a professional tennis tournament played on carpet courts. It is the third edition of the tournament which was part of the 2016 ATP Challenger Tour. It takes place in Brescia, Italy between November 14 and November 20, 2016.

Singles main-draw entrants

Seeds

 1 Rankings are as of November 7, 2016.

Other entrants
The following players received wildcards into the singles main draw:
  Matteo Berrettini
  Tommy Robredo
  Stefano Travaglia
  Andrea Vavassori

The following player received entry into the singles main draw with a protected ranking:
  Blaž Kavčič

The following player received entry into the singles main draw as a special exempt:
  Kevin Krawietz

The following players received entry from the qualifying draw:
  Egor Gerasimov
  Marek Jaloviec
  Petr Michnev
  Lukas Rüpke

The following players received entry as lucky losers:
  Laurynas Grigelis
  Gianluca Mager

Champions

Singles

 Luca Vanni def.  Laurynas Grigelis, 6–7(5–7), 6–4, 7–6(10–8).

Doubles

 Mikhail Elgin /  Alexander Kudryavtsev def.  Wesley Koolhof /  Matwé Middelkoop, 7–6(7–4), 6–3.

External links
Official Website 

Trofeo Citta di Brescia
Trofeo Città di Brescia
2016 in Italian sport